CITTA Mall is a shopping complex in Ara Damansara, Petaling Jaya, Selangor, Malaysia with anchor tenants such as GSC Cinemas, Village Grocer, Mr D.I.Y. and Harvey Norman. As of 1 May 2022, the mall's net lettable area (NLA) of 452,442 sq. ft. and it is reported to be 88.8%  tenanted.

History
CITTA Mall was established in 2011. Managed by CITTA Sdn Bhd, the shopping mall was owned by SEB Asset Management, a German real estate fund manager, and property developer Puncakdana Group  and is now owned by ARA Harmony III and managed by ARA Asset Management Limited (ARA).

An Open-Air Community Mall
CITTA, which means ‘mind’ and heart’ in Pali, adopts an open-air configuration and serves the surrounding Ara Damansara community by providing visitors with a variety of eateries and entertainment options. Its New Year's eve celebrations have become an anticipated annual event thanks to its massive fireworks display.

Corporate information
CITTA Mall, 1 Mont Kiara, Klang Parade, Ipoh Parade, and AEON Bandaraya Melaka are managed by ARA Asset Management Limited (ARA), a premier global integrated real assets fund manager. As of 30 June 2021, the total gross assets managed by ARA Group and its associates is more than US$95 billion in Asia Pacific.

Access
CITTA Mall is accessible via the NKVE, Federal Highway, and Guthrie Corridor as well as the nearby Ara Damansara LRT station.

See also
 Klang Parade
 Ipoh Parade
 1 Mont Kiara

References

External links
CITTA Mall

Petaling Jaya
Shopping malls in Selangor
Shopping malls established in 2011